Annabelle's Wish is a 1997 American direct-to-video animated Christmas film that revolves around a young calf who aspires to learn to fly and become one of Santa Claus' reindeer. It is narrated by American country singer Randy Travis and stars voice actress Kath Soucie as the voice of Annabelle. Hallmark Home Entertainment released the film to video on October 21, 1997, followed by a television broadcast later that year on Fox.

Plot
Annabelle, a calf, is born on Christmas Eve in the rural farming community of Twobridge, Tennessee. Upon meeting Santa Claus, she becomes fascinated with reindeer and their ability to fly, and wishes to fly herself.

Having been granted the temporary ability to speak, she befriends farmer Charles Baker's grandson, Billy, who is mute from inhaling smoke from the barn fire that killed his parents. Billy's Aunt Agnes, the sister of Billy's late father, arrives from the city the next morning. Charles despises Agnes and the two get into an argument about Billy's well being, with Charles pointing out that Agnes didn't want custody of her nephew after his parents passed away, but she reconsidered, mostly in order to have a "perfect Christmas". Charles refuses to give up Billy, but Agnes threatens legal action against him. Meanwhile, Annabelle accidentally reveals her ability to speak, but her mother Star tells her that Billy cannot speak, therefore their secret is safe. They go sledding with Billy's friend Emily and accidentally crash into the fence of Gus Holder, the neighbor and former friend of Charles. Gus' sons Bucky and Buster, who commonly pick on Billy for his muteness, tell their father. Knowing that Charles cannot pay for the damages to the fence, Gus takes Annabelle until Charles can raise the money, which he does by selling an old music box that belonged to Billy's mother and his daughter, the late Sarah Baker. Annabelle enjoys the change of seasons with Billy and Emily. 

Winter comes around and Bucky and Buster harass Emily and Billy one day after school. When the harassment becomes physical, Annabelle retaliates by knocking them down. The boys lie about the incident to their father who calls the sheriff, but he had received an eyewitness statement from the school bus driver. Gus sends his sons to their room and the sheriff talks to him about how his Ebenezer Scrooge-like behavior since his wife's passing has affected his sons. The sheriff also tells Gus that Charles had to sell his daughter's music box to an antique dealer in town in order to pay for both the damages to his fence and to get Annabelle back. Gus starts to feel guilty about what he did to both Charles and Billy after the sheriff reminds him about what it's like to lose a loved one.

Agnes' lawyer later finds a loophole that would grant her custody: Billy can only stay with her if he remains mute. When Agnes returns to Charles' farm to bring Billy back to her home, the animals push her car into a ditch to stall for time. As a result, she has to stay on the farm overnight on Christmas Eve. That night, Santa comes and Annabelle asks him to permanently give her Christmas voice to Billy. Touched by her selflessness, he agrees.

The next morning, Billy finds a present and upon opening it, magically gets his voice back. This renders Agnes' custody order void, allowing Billy to stay with Charles. Billy shows Annabelle his ability to speak, but is shocked to discover that she gave up her voice for him and that hearing him speak again was her true wish. Gus, Bucky, and Buster arrive and apologize for their behavior. Gus reveals that he bought the music box from the antique shop and gives it to Charles. Agnes and Gus become acquainted, and according to the narrator, they marry and Agnes becomes a step-mother to Gus's two sons. 

Years later, Billy (who is revealed to have been the narrator all along) and Emily have grown up, gotten married, and now own the farm after Charles' retirement. Annabelle, having grown old and weary, gives up on her belief that she will ever fly. On Christmas Eve, Santa Claus arrives to fulfill her true wish (a wish from Billy) and she becomes a young reindeer and is given her voice back. She flies away as Santa's lead and bids Billy goodbye and a Merry Christmas.

Cast
 Randy Travis as the narrator and adult Billy
 Kath Soucie as Annabelle (both young calf and adult reindeer)
 Hari Oziol as young Billy
 Jerry Van Dyke as Grandpa Charles Baker
 Cloris Leachman as Aunt Agnes
 Jim Varney as Gus Holder
 Charlie Cronin as Bucky Holder
 James Lafferty as Buster Holder
 Aria Curzon as young Emily
 Beth Nielsen Chapman as adult Emily
 Kay E. Kuter as Santa Claus
 Jennifer Darling as Star
 Rue McClanahan as Scarlett
 Jerry Houser as Slim
 Steve Mackall as Owliver
 Brian Cummings as Brewster
 Mary Kay Bergman and Tress MacNeille as the hens
 Jay Johnson as Ears
 Clancy Brown as the town sheriff and the lawyer
 Stu Rosen as Doc Taylor
 Tress MacNeille, Alison Krauss, and Frank Welker provided additional voices.

Music
The film's score was by Steve Dorff, who also wrote the film's songs with John Bettis and Travis. The songs were performed by Travis, Alison Krauss, Beth Nielsen Chapman, Dolly Parton, Kevin Sharp, and Nanci Griffith.

Release
Annabelle's Wish was released by Hallmark Home Entertainment on October 21, 1997, and was the first film created by Ralph Edwards Films to be released. The film later aired on Fox on November 30, 1997.

Reception
The special received mixed reviews from critics. Lynne Heffley of the Los Angeles Times praised Travis' narration, the score and songs, and the film's "gentle message of selfless love". Andrea Higbie of The New York Times referred to the character of Agnes as the film's version of Cruella de Vil, and wrote that the film would appeal to young viewers but that "its narcissistic dysfunction angle ("If Aunt Agnes doesn't love Billy, why does she want to take him away from Grandpa?") will leave them wishing for a villainess who simply has fur coats on her mind," in reference to de Vil.

When the film premiered on Fox, it was the highest-rated television program among children between the ages of two and five. Annabelle's Wish was also among the top-five best-selling videos during November and December 1997, and was Hallmark Home Entertainment's best-selling video as of January 1998. A portion of the video sale revenues were donated to the Make-A-Wish Foundation.

See also
 List of Christmas films
 Santa Claus in film

References

External links

1997 direct-to-video films
1997 animated films
1990s Christmas films
Sonar Entertainment films
Animated Christmas films
Animated films about orphans
American Christmas films
Animated films about mammals
Films about cattle
Films about deer and moose
Films about shapeshifting
Films scored by Steve Dorff
Films set in Tennessee
Country music films
American animated featurettes
American children's animated fantasy films
American direct-to-video films
Santa Claus's reindeer
Santa Claus in film
1990s English-language films
1990s American films